Los títeres (lit: The Puppets) is a Chilean soap opera created by Sergio Vodanović, that aired on Canal 13 from March 5, to August 3, 1984, starring Claudia Di Girólamo and Gloria Münchmeyer.

Plot

The title, literally "The Marionettes", is taken from the marionettes that are made with the main characters as models. These are used later by one of Adriana's old friends, a kindergarten teacher, to tell fairy tales to the children she teaches. It's also a metaphor, referring to the way people are obsessed with money and power which pull on them like puppet strings.

In the early '60s, a relatively rich Greek man named Constantino Mykonos (Walter Kliche) and his 17-year-old daughter Artemisa (Claudia Di Girólamo) arrive in Chile. They come to the Godán household ruled by Elías (Aníbal Reyna), Constantino's cousin and childhood friend. Artemisa is immediately bullied by his cousin, the spoiled Adriana Godán (played by Paulina García as a young girl and Gloria Münchmayer as an adult) and her school friends. Adriana is jealous of Artemisa's beauty and charisma, and is also obsessed that no woman should surpass her, since her father looked down on her for being female. Adriana's best friend Loreto (Soledad Pérez) is also jealous of Artemisa since her boyfriend, the aspiring writer Néstor (Mauricio Pesutic) is starting to harbor some degree of romantic interest in her. Artemisa likes Néstor, but also has her eyes set on Hugo (Cristián Campos), the handsome and hard-working son of the Godan's housekeeper.

After Adriana stages an incredibly cruel prank that includes photos of a naked Artemisa taken without her knowledge, and Constantino dies in an accident, Artemisa can't resist any more. Despite the pleas and support of her best friend Margarita (Ximena Vidal) and her husband the photographer Klaus Müller (Marcelo González), Artemisa flees to Quito, Ecuador.  Twenty years later, she returns as a cold and gorgeous socialite and businesswoman, determined to face her past. She doesn't know that Adriana, unable to let go of her own jealousy, is already planning to steal Artemisa's hard-won fortune and either send her to a North American jail on false charges or to lock her up in a mental institution.

Final episode
The final episode of Los Títeres shows how Adriana, after all her evil plans crumble, goes completely insane and suffers a regression to her childhood as a little girl who only wished for her father's unconditional love, which was denied her because she was not a boy. At one point, Adriana jumps into a pool and starts playing with a bunch of plastic dolls, while her old and paralyzed father cries; this is the origin of the Chilean slang phrase "peinar la muñeca" ("to comb the doll" in English), which refers to the loss of reason. Adriana Godán is still one of the most popular villains in Chilean telenovelas, as well as one of actress Gloria Münchmayer's most popular roles ever.

Cast
 Claudia Di Girólamo as Artemisa Mikonos.
 Walter Kliche as Constantino Mikonos.
 Paulina García as Adriana Godán (young).
 Gloria Münchmeyer as Adriana Godán (adult).
 Mauricio Pesutic as Néstor.
 Soledad Pérez as Loreto.
 Ximena Vidal as Margarita.
 Marcelo Hernández as Klaus.
 Adriana Vacarezza as Márgara.
 Silvia Santelices as Eva.
 Tennyson Ferrada.
 Carolina Arregui as Gloria.

External links 
 

1984 telenovelas
1984 Chilean television series debuts
1984 Chilean television series endings
Chilean telenovelas
Canal 13 (Chilean TV channel) telenovelas
1980s Chilean television series
Television shows set in Santiago
Spanish-language telenovelas